The Texas puppy mill bill, formally House Bill 1451: The Large-Scale Commercial Dog and Cat Breeder Bill, is a law that lays guidelines for welfare of animals with large-scale commercial breeders in Texas, a state in the United States . The bill specifies parameters such as feed, space, shelter, ventilation and medical care. The law was passed on June 17, 2011, and took effect on September 1, 2012. This legislation was authored by state Rep. Senfronia Thompson, D-Houston. The law considers those breeders who keep 11 or more breeding females or sell 20 or more off-springs in a year as large-scale breeders and thus under its scope. A motion was filed in Austin's federal district court by three breeders and the Responsible Pet Owners Alliance (RPOA), which represents 305 American Kennel Club groups in Texas, seeking that the bill be struck down as unconstitutional. An amicus curiae was presented by the Texas Humane Legislation Network with support from the Humane Society of the United States urging the court to uphold the bill. The bill was defended by the Texas Attorney General's office. On January 31, 2013, federal district judge James R. Nowlin denied the motion and upheld the constitution validity of the bill. Although the legislation is popularly known as "puppy mill bill", it addresses large-scale breeders.  This law does not regulate hobby breeders.

The law is administered by the Texas Department of Licensing and Regulation, who issued rules regarding the administration of the program.

Alicia Graef, writing for Care2, has described the ruling as triumph of puppies over angry breeders. Opponents of the bill, such as members of RPOA argued that the bill wouldn't alleviate the sufferings of badly treated animals but would create a "dog Gestapo".

References

Animal welfare and rights legislation in the United States
Canids and humans
Dog breeding
Puppy mill bill
Puppy mill bill
Puppy mill bill